The former British Consulate is a building that housed the United Kingdom consulate in Tunis, Tunisia, later upgraded to an embassy, following Tunisia's independence in 1956. It is located on Victory Square (formerly ), adjacent to the medina of Tunis.

History 

Diplomatic relations between the Regency of Tunis and the United Kingdom began in 1662, with the signing of a peace treaty.

The first consulate building was erected in the seventeenth century. It was replaced by a second, in European style, in the early nineteenth century.

The building on Victory Square was erected in 1914, in a Moorish revival style.

References 

Buildings and structures in Tunis
Diplomatic buildings
Diplomatic missions of the United Kingdom
Tunisia–United Kingdom relations
Diplomatic missions in Tunisia